Sara Curtis (born 19 August 2006) is an Italian competitive swimmer specializing in sprint freestyle and backstroke events. At the 2022 World Junior Championships, she won silver medals in the 50-metre freestyle, 4×100-metre medley relay, and 4×100-metre mixed medley relay, a bronze medal in the 50-metre backstroke, and placed fourth in the 100-metre backstroke. At the 2022 European Junior Championships, she won a gold medal in the 4×100-metre freestyle relay and bronze medals in the 50-metre freestyle and the 4×100-metre medley relay.

Background
Curtis trains under the guidance of coach Thomas Maggiora with Team Dimensione Nuoto.

Career

2022

2022 European Junior Championships
At the 2022 European Junior Swimming Championships, in July in Otopeni, Romania, Curtis won a gold medal as part of the 4×100-metre freestyle relay, splitting a 56.50 for the third leg of the relay to contribute to a final time of 3:42.98. In the 50-metre freestyle, she won the bronze medal with a personal best time of 25.39 seconds, finishing 0.17 seconds behind gold medalist Nina Jazy of Germany and 0.05 seconds behind silver medalist Bianca Costea of Romania. For her other events, she won a bronze medal as part of the 4×100-metre medley relay, swimming the backstroke portion of the relay in the final with a personal best time of 1:01.92, placed fifth in the final of the 50-metre backstroke with a personal best time of 28.79 seconds, placed sixth in the final of the 100-metre backstroke with a 1:02.00, and placed 20th in the 100-metre freestyle with a time of 57.57 seconds.

Following her performances, Curtis competed at the 2022 Italian Junior National Championships in Ostia, winning the gold medal in the 50-metre freestyle with a Championships record of 25.40 seconds, gold medals in the 50-metre backstroke and 100-metre backstroke, and a silver medal in the 100-metre freestyle.

2022 World Junior Championships

On the second day of the 2022 FINA World Junior Swimming Championships, 31 August in Lima, Peru, Curtis placed fourth in her first final of the Championships, the 100-metre backstroke, with a time of 1:02.10, which was 0.70 seconds behind gold medalist Dóra Molnár of Hungary and 0.44 seconds ahead of fifth-place finisher Aissia Prisecariu of Romania. Later in the same session, she won her first medal of the Championships, a silver medal in the 4×100-metre mixed medley relay, contributing a 1:03.19 for the backstroke portion of the relay to the final time of 3:55.58. Three days later, she won her first individual medal, a bronze medal in the 50-metre backstroke, finishing 0.42 seconds behind gold medalist Lora Komoróczy of Hungary with a time of 28.93 seconds. The following day, she started the finals session with a silver medal in the 50-metre freestyle, finishing in a time of 25.53 seconds. She concluded with a 1:03.14 backstroke leg of the 4×100-metre medley relay in the final, helping finish second and win the silver medal with a time of 4:06.91. Her medals contributed to a record 20 total medals won by Italy at a single FINA World Junior Swimming Championships.

2023
In January 2023, Curtis achieved a pair of personal best times at the 23rd Luxembourg Euro Meet in Luxembourg, placing second in the final of the 50-metre freestyle with a time of 25.33 seconds, which was 0.15 seconds behind first-place finisher and fellow Italian Silvia Di Pietro, and fourth in the final of the 100-metre freestyle in 55.73 seconds.

International championships (50 m)

Personal best times

Long course metres (50 m pool)

Legend: r – relay 1st leg

References

External links
 

2006 births
Living people
Italian female backstroke swimmers
Italian female freestyle swimmers
21st-century Italian women